Yan Zi and Jie Zheng were the defending champions, but Zheng chose not to participate, and only Yan competed that year.
Yan partnered with Tatiana Perebiynis, and won in the final 6–4, 6–7(3–7), 10–6, against Yung-jan Chan and Chia-jung Chuang.

Seeds

Draw

Draw

External links
Draw 

2008, Doubles
Internationaux de Strasbourg
2008 in French tennis